The 1928 Tennessee gubernatorial election was held on November 6, 1928. Incumbent Democrat Henry Hollis Horton defeated Republican nominee Raleigh Hopkins with 61.06% of the vote.

Primary elections
Primary elections were held on August 2, 1928.

Democratic primary

Candidates
Henry Hollis Horton, incumbent Governor
Hill McAlister, Tennessee State Treasurer
Lewis S. Pope
D. W. Dodson

Results

General election

Candidates
Henry Hollis Horton, Democratic
Raleigh Hopkins, Republican

Results

References

1928
Tennessee
Gubernatorial